Sharpe's Triumph is the second historical novel in the Richard Sharpe series by Bernard Cornwell, first published in 1998. Sharpe is a sergeant in the army who attracts the attention of General Arthur Wellesley at Ahmednagar.

Plot summary

Sergeant Richard Sharpe and a small detachment arrive at an isolated East India Company fort to transport 80,000 recovered rounds of stolen ammunition to the armory at Seringapatam.  While Sharpe and his men rest, a company of East India Company sepoys arrive under the command of Lieutenant William Dodd.  Dodd abruptly has his men massacre the unsuspecting, outnumbered garrison.  Sharpe is wounded and feigns death, allowing him to escape Dodd's determination to leave no witnesses.

Back in Seringapatam, Sharpe's friend, Colonel McCandless, whom Sharpe met four years earlier during the siege of Seringapatam (Sharpe's Tiger), questions him about Dodd. Dodd deserted the East India Company, taking with him his sepoys, and McCandless has been tasked with bringing him to justice, lest it give others similar ideas.  McCandless orders Sharpe to accompany him since he can identify Dodd.

Dodd joins Colonel Anthony Pohlmann, commander of Scindia's army, at the city of Ahmednuggur and is rewarded with a promotion to major and command of his own battalion. Since the Mysore Campaign, the British have been pushing further north into the Maratha Confederacy's territory. Scindia is one of the Maratha rulers who have decided to resist the British advance.  Scindia orders Pohlmann to assign a regiment to defend Ahmednuggur, so Pohlmann gives Dodd command of the unit and instructions to inflict casualties on the British, but most importantly, withdraw and keep the regiment intact, as the city cannot be held.

Meanwhile, Sergeant Obadiah Hakeswill correctly guesses that Sharpe killed the Tippoo Sultan four years earlier at Seringapatam and looted the corpse. Hakeswill frames him for an attack on his former company commander, Captain Morris.  Given a warrant to arrest Sharpe, Hakeswill recruits six cutthroats to help him murder Sharpe, so they can steal the treasure.

Sharpe and McCandless travel to the British army, escorted by Syud Sevajee, the Maratha leader of a band of mercenary cavalrymen working for the East India Company.  They reach the army, under the command of Major General Arthur Wellesley, Sharpe's former regimental commander and the future Duke of Wellington. Upon arrival at Ahmednuggur, Wellesley quickly launches a risky escalade without the usual days-long artillery bombardment, in a bid to take the enemy by surprise. He quickly captures the poorly fortified town, to the amazement of Dodd, who has a poor opinion of Wellesley. Despite this, Dodd manages to extract his troops from the rout and retreats to Pohlmann's army. In the chaos of the battle, Sharpe rescues Simone Joubert, the wife of a French captain in Dodd's regiment.  Under the pretext of returning Madame Joubert to her husband, McCandless hopes to be able to reconnoitre the Maratha army. They do not leave immediately, however, and Sharpe spends the night with Simone, though she regrets her decision the next day.

The next day, they reach the Maratha army. Pohlmann deduces McCandless's real intentions, but knowing that his army vastly outnumbers the British, allows McCandless to see everything he wants. At the same time, Pohlmann tries to recruit Sharpe, offering to make him a lieutenant. He tells Sharpe of the various successes that other lowly European soldiers have had in India, including his own rise from East India Company sergeant. That evening, Sharpe considers defecting, but, before he can make a decision, his and McCandless's horses are stolen and McCandless is shot in the thigh.  Sharpe apprehends one of the thieves, who turns out to be one of Dodd's men.  Everyone is certain that Dodd ordered the theft, but Pohlmann only has the thief executed by being trampled by an elephant.  Meanwhile, Hakeswill takes his request to arrest Sharpe to Wellesley, who informs him that Sharpe will not return for some time.  He assigns Hakeswill to the baggage train in the meantime, infuriating the impatient sergeant.

The Maratha army moves on, leaving McCandless behind at his own request. Sharpe decides to look after the wounded colonel, thereby turning down Pohlmann's offer. Nevertheless, he begins to wonder about how he might become an officer.  Recognizing the ambition Pohlmann has stoked in the sergeant, McCandless cautions Sharpe.  At the time, almost all of the officers in the British Army come from wealthy families and pay for their commissions.  Those exceptional few who rise from the ranks are resented and have little chance of advancement.  While McCandless recovers, Syud Sevajee locates them and delivers McCandless's report to Wellesley.

When McCandless is recovered enough, he and Sharpe rejoin the army as it advances towards Borkardan.  Using one of the Tippoo's emeralds, Sharpe buys one of Wellesley's horses for McCandless, though he pretends to Wellesley that McCandless is the purchaser. The surprised McCandless learns about Sharpe and the Tippoo's death. The next day, Hakeswill attempts to arrest Sharpe, but McCandless smudges the ink on the warrant so that it reads "Sharp", not "Sharpe", and refuses to let him take Sharpe. 

After weeks of aimless marching, the Maratha leaders meet and finally decide to engage the British near Assaye. Pohlmann is given overall command. The British have two forces, one under the command of Wellesley and the other under Colonel Stevenson.  Pohlmann plans to fight and defeat them separately, before they can join forces. Wellesley discovers that the enemy is closer than he thought and fully aware of the situation, but is still determined to attack.

Pohlmann sets a trap. He deploys his army at what he is told are the only usable fords of the River Kaitna, but Wellesley deduces that there must be another one between two villages on opposite banks of the river.  Using this ford, Wellesley crosses the river to try to launch a flank attack, but Pohlmann redeploys to face him.  Wellesley's aide is killed, and Sharpe takes his place. Back with the baggage, McCandless confronts Hakeswill about the warrant and warns Hakeswill that he knows he lied and that he will inform his commander. On the British left, the 78th Highland Regiment and the sepoys advance through heavy artillery fire and rout much of the Pohlmann's infantry.  On the right, however, the 74th and some picquets advance too far towards the village of Assaye and are forced to form square against attack from Maratha light cavalry. Dodd's regiment then attacks the two pinned-down units.

Meanwhile, some Maratha gunners retake their guns and fire them into the rear of Wellesley's men, so Wellesley orders a cavalry charge.  During the fight, he is unhorsed alone amidst the enemy. Sharpe launches a savage attack, saving his commander and single-handedly killing many men.  Friendly troops arrive, and a shaken Wellesley leaves.  With the collapse of the Maratha right, Dodd is forced to retreat. During the fighting, Hakeswill finds McCandless alone and kills him.

As the Maratha forces flee in disarray, Sharpe comes across Pohlmann, but does not apprehend him.  He also finds Simone Joubert. Dodd killed her husband during the retreat, so Sharpe takes her under his protection again. Eventually, he catches up to Wellesley's staff and is astonished when Wellesley rewards him by giving him a battlefield promotion, making him an ensign in the 74th.  Afterward, Hakeswill tries again to arrest Sharpe, but Sharpe's new commanding officer points out that the warrant for Sergeant Sharpe is useless against Ensign Sharpe. Sharpe triumphantly forces Hakeswill, who initially refuses to acknowledge Sharpe's new rank, to address him as "sir".

Characters
 Richard Sharpe – British Army Sergeant, protagonist
 Major General Arthur Wellesley – commander of British and Indian Allied Forces in South Central India
 Lieutenant Colin Campbell - who led the storming of the walls of Ahmednaghar
 Sergeant Obadiah Hakeswill – Sharpe's enemy in the British Army
 Simone Joubert – wife to the Frenchman Joubert
 Colonel Hector McCandless – Scottish intelligence officer for the British East India Company
 Colonel Anthony Pohlmann – the defected Hanoverian sergeant who became Scindia's army commander
 Major William Dodd – the traitorous British East India Company lieutenant now serving Scindia, he commands a specialize Sepoy company known as Dodd's Cobras
 Daulat Scindia – the Indian raja of Gwalior, a state within the Maratha Confederacy
 Raghji Bhonsle – the raja of Berar, an ally of Scindia
 Captain Morris – the commanding officer of the 33rd Light Company

Release details
1998, UK, HarperCollins , Pub date 26 February 1998, hardback (First edition)
1998, UK, HarperCollins , Pub date 1 June 1998, Audio book cassette
1999, UK, HarperCollins , Pub date 5 July 1999, paperback 
2000, USA, HarperCollins , Pub date August 2000, paperback
2001, UK, Chivers Audio Books , Pub date December 2001, Audio book CD
2005, USA, HarperTorch , Pub date June 2005, paperback
2006, UK, HarperCollins , Pub date 18 April 2006, paperback (recent TV tie-in)

External links
Section from Bernard Cornwell's website on Sharpe's Triumph

1998 British novels
Triumph
Second Anglo-Maratha War
Novels set in Maharashtra
Fiction set in 1803
Jalna district
HarperCollins books